The 1972 Vermont Catamounts football team was an American football team that represented  the University of Vermont in the Yankee Conference during the 1972 NCAA College Division football season. In their first year under head coach Carl Falivene, the team compiled a 4–5 record.

Schedule

References

Vermont
Vermont Catamounts football seasons
Vermont Catamounts football